In mathematics, a topological space is said to be weakly contractible if all of its homotopy groups are trivial.

Property
It follows from Whitehead's Theorem that if a CW-complex is weakly contractible then it is contractible.

Example
Define  to be the inductive limit of the spheres . Then this space is weakly contractible. Since  is moreover a CW-complex, it is also contractible.  See Contractibility of unit sphere in Hilbert space for more.

The Long Line is an example of a space which is weakly contractible, but not contractible. This does not contradict Whitehead theorem since the Long Line does not have the homotopy type of a CW-complex.
Another prominent example for this phenomenon is the Warsaw circle.

References

Topology
Homotopy theory